is a 2009 Japanese action film directed by Takashi Miike with a screenplay by Shogo Muto. It is the second film based on the manga Crows by Hiroshi Takahashi, and a direct sequel to 2007's Crows Zero. The film stars much of the cast from the first film, including Shun Oguri, Kyōsuke Yabe, Meisa Kuroki, and Takayuki Yamada reprising their roles. It was released in Japan on April 11, 2009.

Plot 
Eight months after triumphing over Serizawa Tamao (Takayuki Yamada), Takiya Genji (Shun Oguri) still struggles to attain supremacy at Suzuran All-Boys High School. Following a decisive defeat at the hands of the legendary Rindaman, and on the verge of graduating without fulfilling his goal, Genji grows quietly desperate. He begins challenging Rindaman regularly, but consistently fails to beat him. His situation escalates when he unwittingly breaks a non-aggression pact between Suzuran and a rival school, Housen Academy, by coming to the aid of Kawanishi Noboru (Shinnosuke Abe) during a heated confrontation. Genji learns that the agreement between the two schools was established two years prior when, during a skirmish, Noboru violated a gang law and used a weapon to fatally wound Housen's former leader, Bitō Makio. Suzuran had subsequently sworn not to interfere with Housen's retribution upon Noboru's release from prison. Genji's protection of Kawanishi provokes Housen's current leader, Narumi Taiga (Nobuaki Kaneko), to declare war against Suzuran. Genji and his allies go on the defensive, engaging in several violent conflicts with Housen's "Army of Killers".

Cast
 Shun Oguri - Takiya Genji
 Takayuki Yamada - Serizawa Tamao
 Kuroki Meisa - Aizawa Ruka
 Kyōsuke Yabe - Katagiri Ken
 Kenta Kiritani - Tatsukawa Tokio
 Suzunosuke Tanaka - Tamura Chūta
 Sōsuke Takaoka - Izaki Shun
 Goro Kishitani - Takiya Hideo
 Motoki Fukami - Rindaman / Hayashida Megumi
 Shunsuke Daitō - Kirishima Hiromi
 Tsutomu Takahashi - Makise Takashi
 Yusuke Kamiji - Tsutsumoto Shōji
 Yusuke Izaki - Mikami Manabu
 Hisato Izaki - Mikami Takeshi
 Ryō Hashizume - Honjō Toshiaki
 Yu Koyanagi - Sugihara Makoto
 Kaname Endō - Tokaji Yūji
 Shinnosuke Abe - Kawanishi Noboru
 Yoshiyuki Yamaguchi - Bitō Makio
 Nobuaki Kaneko - Narumi Taiga
 Kengo Ohkuchi - Kumagiri Rikiya
 Tomoya Warabino - Shibayama Hayato
 Gō Ayano - Urushibara Ryō
 Kazuki Namioka - Washio Gōta
 Haruma Miura - Bitō Tatsuya

Release
The film was released in Japan on April 11, 2009. It was also screened internationally in Singapore, Russia, and Hong Kong throughout 2009, and in the United States at the Santa Barbara International Film Festival on February 6, 2010.

Reception

Box office
The film grossed US$29,893,636 worldwide.

Critical reception
Reviews of the film were generally positive. Niels Matthijs of Twitch Film gave it a positive review, saying, "Visually Crows Zero II is still looking incredibly slick. Maybe not as many landmark shots, but the dense and graffiti-laden backgrounds make for a tasty looking film alright. The fighting scenes are still a blast to behold too, with strong, intense and action-driven camera work and some tight editing to keep the adrenaline flowing." Likewise, Mark Schilling of The Japan Times gave the film 3.5 out of 5 stars, saying, "Miike directs with an energy, velocity and cheeky bravado that are pure punk. He also understands why his Suzuran toughs fight as easily as they breathe - it’s not just a release for their raging hormones, but a way of being with their friends and telling the world they exist."

Sequels & adaptations
The film was followed by a sequel, Crows Explode, in 2014. It was also adapted into a manga entitled Crows Zero II: Suzuran x Housen, illustrated by Hirakawa Tetsuhiro (writer of Clover) and published in Bessatsu Shōnen Champion magazine.

References

External links

2009 films
Films about school violence
Live-action films based on manga
Films directed by Takashi Miike
2000s Japanese-language films
Japanese sequel films
2000s gang films
2000s high school films
Japanese high school films
2000s Japanese films